The Câlnic is a left tributary of the river Secaș in Romania. It discharges into the Secaș in Cunța. It flows through the village Câlnic.

References

Rivers of Romania
Rivers of Alba County